Haapsalu Airfield or Kiltsi Airfield ; is a disused airfield in Estonia, located  southwest of Haapsalu. It was first built by the Soviets in 1939. During the Soviet era it was an interceptor aircraft base. It was a small fighter airfield with a few revetments. It was home to 425th Interceptor Aviation Regiment (425 IAP) between 1970 and 1992, flying up to 38 Mikoyan-Gurevich MiG-23 (ASCC: Flogger) jets in 1991. The airfield has been abandoned since the Soviet army left it in the early 1990s.

References

Defunct airports in Estonia
Buildings and structures in Lääne County
Soviet Air Force bases
Soviet Air Defence Force bases
Ridala Parish
Haapsalu